Ylistrum japonicum, known as saucer scallop is found around the waters of Japan, Philippines, south eastern Asia and Australia. Well regarded as seafood in Asia and Australia.

References

Pectinidae
Seafood
Bivalves described in 1791
Taxa named by Johann Friedrich Gmelin